Paul Ricard was a hydrofoiled trimaran.  In 1980, Éric Tabarly sailed the vessel to beat Charlie Barr's transatlantic record on Atlantic, which had stood for 75 years.

See also
List of multihulls
Single-Handed Trans-Atlantic Race

References

1980s sailing yachts